Burak Elmas (born 19 March 1974) is a Turkish businessman who was the 38th president of sports club Galatasaray S.K.

Family
He was born on 19 March 1974, in Şişli, Istanbul, as the son of Sezgin and Saniye Elmas. He has two sister named Burçin Elmas and Burçak Elmas Deniz. He is from Giresun on his father's side. He married Yelda Süren, the daughter of businessman Faruk Süren, one of the former Galatasaray presidents.

Business life
Having started his business life in one of Turkey's largest independent FMCG distributors, Elmas established a UK-based international logistics company after taking a managerial role in family companies and many international joint ventures. Elmas, who has been working as a senior manager (CEO) at Godiva Investment company since 2008 and reporting to the group's board of directors, also served as a board member at Yıldız Group, one of the largest Turkish enterprises in the production of food products.

Representing the companies he worked for in his working life in senior positions, Elmas worked in various countries such as Japan, England, America and People's Republic of China during this period. Elmas currently serves as an investor partner and independent board member in three international companies in the UK and Turkey.

Galatasaray career
Elmas was appointed as Galatasaray U21 team manager in 1997, when he was only 23 years old. Later, he took part in the management of Faruk Süren and Özhan Canaydın.

In the first term of Mustafa Cengiz, he was a member of the Board of Sportif AŞ.

Presidential career
On 2 March 2021, he announced that he was running for the presidency of Galatasaray (GS), and in the election held on 19 June 2021, he received 1541 votes and was elected the 38th president of Galatasaray Sports Club. Just after 9 months of presidency, Elmas has to quit from his role after didn't get vote of confidence from Galatasaray members.  He also had problems with the fans, especially in the Kayserispor match on February 12, 2022, because of the failure of Galatasaray. Elmas is considered "worst president in Galatasaray history" by actor Şahan Gökbakar, who is also a Galatasaray member.

See also
 List of Galatasaray S.K. presidents

References

Living people
1974 births
Businesspeople from Istanbul
Galatasaray S.K. presidents
21st-century Turkish businesspeople
St. George's Austrian High School alumni
University of Denver alumni